Angela Down (born 15 June 1946) is an English actress. She is known for her role in the BBC drama programme Take Three Girls portraying cockney art student Avril for the first series before being replaced in the second.

Career 
Down played a leading role as Princess Maria in the 15-hour BBC version of Leo Tolstoy's War and Peace (1972), starred as Sylvia Pankhurst in the BBC's Shoulder to Shoulder (1974), as Joyce Bradley in the television adaptation of Frederick Raphael’s The Glittering Prizes (1976) and played teacher Myra Bawne in the 1980 BBC drama serial We, the Accused, opposite Ian Holm. She performed as Helena in the 1981 BBC Shakespeare collection, All's Well That Ends Well. 

Her film roles include appearances in The Looking Glass War (1970), the cult horror film What Became of Jack and Jill? (1972), as Justine Mahler in Ken Russell's 1974 film Mahler, and as Mrs Cole in the 1996 film Emma, starring Gwyneth Paltrow.

Personal life 
She is married to the actor Tim Hardy.

Filmography

Film

Television

References

External links
 

1946 births
Living people
20th-century English actresses
British television actresses
People from Hampstead